Mellouli is a surname. Notable people with the surname include:

 Farid Mellouli (born 1984), Algerian association football player
 Oussama Mellouli (born 1984), Tunisian swimmer